Birkot hashachar or Birkot haShachar are a series of blessings that are recited at the beginning of Jewish morning services. The blessings represent thanks to God for a renewal of the day.

The order of the blessings is not defined by halakha and may vary in each siddur, but is generally based on the order of activities customary upon arising.

The blessings

Al netilat yadayim

This blessing represents the cleanliness of one's hands following ritual defilement.

Asher yatzar

This is a blessing regarding the workings of one's body. It is also recited each time following one's urination or defecation.

Elohai neshama
This paragraph represents thanks to God for the return of one's soul. When one sleeps, the soul departs the body. This state is referred to as a "semi-death." Upon awakening, the body is reunited with the soul.

Blessings of Torah study
The Birkot hashachar includes some blessings pertaining to Torah study. It is forbidden for one to study any Torah prior to reciting these blessings. One of the blessings is identical to the one that is recited by a person called for an aliyah.

Since one is required to fulfill a mitzvah immediately after reciting a blessing on that mitzvah without interruption, some verses from the oral and written Torah are recited immediately following this blessing. In the Eastern Ashkenazic rite, verses including Numbers 6:24-26 (known as the Priestly Blessing), the Mishnah Peah 1:1, and Talmud Shabbat 127a are recited; in the Western Ashkenazic rite, the "korbanot" section is recited immediately.

Blessings of Praise
This is a series of blessings of praise.  Although the Talmud prescribes their recitation alongside the actions that they are associated with, the common practice is to recite them all as a series of blessings.

References

Shacharit
Siddur of Orthodox Judaism
Hebrew words and phrases in Jewish prayers and blessings